This is a list of cricketers who have played first-class, List A or Twenty20 cricket for Odisha cricket team, previously known as the Orissa cricket team.

Noman
 A K Adhikari
 Pawan Agarwal
 Sridhar Alva
 Haji Amin
 Vemulapally Arvind

B
 P Badrayya
 N D Bardhan
 Ajay Barikj
 Alekha Barik
 Manoj Barik
 Deepak Behera
 Jayanta Behera
 Natraj Behera
 Niranjan Behera
 S Behera
 Subrat Behera
 P Bhadrya
 Anil Bhardwaj (cricketer)
 Manojit Bhatt
 R K Bhave
 Subhashish Bhuyan
 B Bishanjee
 Chiranjib Biswal
 Ranjib Biswal
 Subit Biswal
 Gopal Bose
 P Bose
 Pannalal Bose
 Rajayya Bosi

C
 N Chakrabarty
 T Chakraborty
 Ramesh Chandok
 A K Channa
 Pradyumna Chowdhury
 Soumitra Chowdhury
 M C Clerici

D
 Amit Das (cricketer, born 1989)
 Amit Das (cricketer, born 1992)
 Halhadar Das
 Pratik Das
 Rishikesh Das
 Shiv Sunder Das
 Rajesh Dhuper
 Karun Dubey

G
 Sivam Gainward(cricketer)

J
 Amit Jena

K
 Devendra Kunwar                                                                                                                               *  Saurabh Kanojia

M
 Abhilash Mallick
 Santanu Mishra
 Basant Mohanty
 Debashish Mohanty
 Rakesh Mohanty
 Yashpal Mohanty
 Sourajit Mohapatra
 Robin Morris
 Pravanjan Mullick
 Sumeet Mahanti
 Satyajit Mishra
 Prasanta Mohapatra

N
 Subham Nayak

P
 A. Panda
 Bibhudutta Panda
 Rashmi Parida
 Paresh Patel (cricketer)
 Rajkishan Patel
 Bikas Pati
 Banabasi Patnaik
 Sandeep Pattnaik
 Govinda Poddar
 Debabrata Pradhan
 Suryakant Pradhan
 Sushil Kumar Prasad

R
 M S Ananthaswamy Rao
 Sanjay Raul
 Saurabh Rawat
 Girjia Rout

S
 Abinash Saha
 Alok Chandra Sahoo
 Tukuna Sahoo
 Biplab Samantray
 Debasish Samantray
 Anurag Sarangi
 Subhranshu Senapati
 Rajiv Seth
 Aravind Singh
 Baljit Singh (cricketer, born 1981)
 Bipin Singh
 Dhiraj Singh
 Prayash Singh
 Ranjit Singh (cricketer, born 1994)

Y
 Abhishek Yadav (cricketer)

References
General
 

Specific

Odisha cricketers

cricketers